

People
Lechner is a surname. Notable people with the surname include:

Alfred James Lechner Jr. (born 1955), American judge
Anton Lechner (1907–1975), German SS officer
Auguste Lechner (1905–2000), Austrian writer
Bernard J. Lechner (1932–2014), American electronics engineer
Corinna Lechner (born 1994), German cyclist
Cornelia Lechner (born 1966), German tennis player
Ed Lechner (1919–2015), American football player
Elisabeth Adele Allram-Lechner (1824–1861), Czech stage actress
Emilio Lechner (born 1940), Italian luger
Erika Lechner (born 1947), Italian luger
Eva Lechner (born 1985), Italian cyclist
Florian Lechner (born 1981), German footballer
Franco Lechner, known as Bombolo (1931 - 1987), Italian comedian 
Gustav Lechner (1913–1987), Croatian footballer
Harald Lechner (born 1982), Austrian football referee
Heinz Lechner (born 1928), Austrian fencer
Johnny Lechner, American actor
Kerim Lechner (born 1989), Austrian musician
Kurt Lechner (born 1942), German CDU politician
Leonhard Lechner (1553–1606), German composer
Matthias Lechner (born 1970), German set designer
Maximilian Lechner (born 1990), Austrian pool player
Natalie Bauer-Lechner (1858–1921), Austrian violist
Patrick Lechner (born 1988), German cyclist
Peter Lechner (born 1966), Austrian luger
Ödön Lechner (1845–1914), Hungarian architect
Otto Lechner (born 1964), Austrian accordionist
Robert Lechner (born 1967), German cyclist
Walter Lechner (1949–2020), Austrian racing driver

Other
Mount Lechner, Antarctica
Lechner (windsurf board)

German-language surnames